Ren Xiujuan (born September 14, 1974 in Dalian, Liaoning) is a female Chinese long-distance runner who specialized in the marathon. She represented her country twice in the Olympic marathon, having her best placing of ninth in 1996. She also ranked fifth in the 10,000 metres at the 1997 World Championships in Athletics. She won a global title at the 1996 IAAF World Half Marathon Championships, becoming the first Asian person to win that event.

She won the 1995 Beijing Marathon in a time of 2:30:00 and repeated that feat in 1996, improving to 2:27:13 hours. Her final race in Beijing came in 2001, when she placed third in 2:24:22 hours – a personal best.

International competitions

Personal bests
5000 metres - 15:49.90 min (2000)
10,000 metres - 31:13.21 min (1996)
Marathon - 2:24:22 hrs (2001)

References

sports-reference

1974 births
Living people
Athletes from Dalian
Chinese female marathon runners
Chinese female long-distance runners
Olympic athletes of China
Athletes (track and field) at the 1996 Summer Olympics
Athletes (track and field) at the 2000 Summer Olympics
World Athletics Championships athletes for China
World Athletics Half Marathon Championships winners
Runners from Liaoning